BCS-FACS is the BCS Formal Aspects of Computing Science Specialist Group.

Overview
The FACS group, inaugurated on 16 March 1978, organizes meetings for its members and others on formal methods and related computer science topics. There is an associated journal, Formal Aspects of Computing, published by Springer, and a more informal FACS FACTS newsletter.

The group celebrated its 20th anniversary with a meeting at the Royal Society in London in 1998, with presentations by four eminent computer scientists, Mike Gordon, Tony Hoare, Robin Milner and Gordon Plotkin, all Fellows of the Royal Society.

From 2002–2008 and since 2013 again, the Chair of BCS-FACS has been Jonathan Bowen. Jawed Siddiqi was Chair during 2008–2013. In December 2002, BCS-FACS organized a conference on the Formal Aspects of Security (FASec'02) at Royal Holloway, University of London. In 2004, FACS organized a major event at London South Bank University to celebrate its own 25th anniversary and also 25 Years of CSP (CSP25), attended by the originator of CSP, Sir Tony Hoare, and others in the field.

The group liaises with other related groups such as the Centre for Software Reliability, Formal Methods Europe, the London Mathematical Society Computer Committee, the Safety-Critical Systems Club, and the Z User Group. It has held joint meetings with other BCS specialist groups such as the Advanced Programming Group and BCSWomen.

FACS sponsors and supports meetings, such as the Refinement Workshop. It has often held a Christmas event each year, with a theme related to formal aspects of computing — for example, teaching formal methods and formal methods in industry. BCS-FACS supported the ABZ 2008 conference at the BCS London premises. In 2015, FACS hosted a two-day ProCoS Workshop on "Provably Correct Systems", with many former members of the ESPRIT ProCoS I and II projects and Working Group of the 1990s.

Evening seminars

In recent years, a series of evening seminars have been held, mainly at the BCS London office. Speakers have included leading computer scientists, mainly from the United Kingdom but some from abroad, including Samson Abramsky FRS, Jean-Raymond Abrial (France/Switzerland), Farhad Arbab, Troy Astarte, Dines Bjørner (Denmark), Robin Bloomfield, Richard Bornat (twice), Egon Börger (Italy), Jonathan Bowen, Jan Broenink (Netherlands), Michael Butler, Muffy Calder OBE (twice), Jack Copeland (New Zealand), Tim Denvir, Cedric Fournet (France), Mike Gordon FRS, Anthony Hall, Mark Harman, Martin Henson, Rob Hierons, Jane Hillston, Mike Hinchey, Sir Tony Hoare FRS, Mike Holcombe, Michael Jackson, Cliff Jones, Marta Kwiatkowska (twice), Zhiming Liu, Tom Maibaum, Ursula Martin CBE, Peter Mosses, Ben Moszkowski, Peter O'Hearn FRS, Steve Reeves (New Zealand), John Reynolds (USA), Peter Ryan, Steve Schneider, Joe Stoy, David Turner, John Tucker, Phil Wadler, among others.
In 2010, a book of chapters based on some of these talks was published.
Talks have been held annually with Formal Methods Europe and the London Mathematical Society (at the LMS headquarters in central London). Since 2010, there has been an Annual Peter Landin Semantics Seminar held each December in memory of the British computer scientist Peter Landin (1930–2009).

FACS FACTS newsletter
The FACS FACTS newsletter is published periodically, originally on paper and now online. The editors are Tim Denvir and Brian Monahan.

F. X. Reid has been a regular FACS FACTS newsletter contributor in the past. For example, he has been an enthusiast for the COMEFROM statement and an expert on its semantics. Apparently reports of FXR's death in 2006 were untrue and his musings continued after this time in the newsletter.

See also
 British Computer Society
 Formal methods
 Formal Methods Europe (FME)
 London Mathematical Society

References

External links
 BCS-FACS website
 Alternative BCS-FACS website
 BCS-FACS group on LinkedIn
 Former BCS-FACS website (2008) on Archive.org

1978 establishments in the United Kingdom
Organizations established in 1978
Formal methods organizations
FACS
Non-profit organisations based in the United Kingdom